Unstruttal is a Verbandsgemeinde ("collective municipality") in the Burgenlandkreis (district), in Saxony-Anhalt, Germany. Before 1 January 2010, it was a Verwaltungsgemeinschaft. It is situated along the river Unstrut, approx. 50 km west of Leipzig. The seat of the Verbandsgemeinde is in Freyburg.

The Verbandsgemeinde Unstruttal consists of the following municipalities:

 Balgstädt 
 Freyburg
 Gleina 
 Goseck 
 Karsdorf 
 Laucha an der Unstrut
 Nebra

References

Verbandsgemeinden in Saxony-Anhalt